Alessandro Gilardi (born 8 January 1995) is an Italian football player.

Club career
He made his Serie B debut for Pro Vercelli on 18 May 2017 in a game against Frosinone.

References

External links
 

1995 births
Sportspeople from the Metropolitan City of Turin
Footballers from Piedmont
Living people
Italian footballers
Torino F.C. players
F.C. Pro Vercelli 1892 players
Serie B players
Serie D players
Association football goalkeepers